Vyankatesh Asarkar, commonly known as Dadasaheb Asarkar (born - 15 Dec 1895, died - 15 May 1965) was an Indian flute player and a flute manufacturer.

References

Indian flautists